Kwun Chung, or Koon Chung in early documents, is an area of Hong Kong, Yau Ma Tei or Tsim Sha Tsui located in the Yau Tsim Mong District.

In 1979, the MTR station running through Kwun Chung was named Jordan since it intersected Jordan Road and nearby bus stops were also relabeled Jordan. This resulted in the area being called Jordan by residents, since most MTR stations are named after the district or area in which it serves.

History

Its Chinese name literally means "government creek", which was named for the pre-19th century presence of Imperial China's military in defence against pirates and foreigners. Since Hong Kong was sparsely populated during the time, this referenced name may have superseded any local name. In early British maps, Kwun Chung was a river valley north of a series of hills called Napiers Range with a namesake village and cultivation. The valley extended from the shore to the middle of the Kowloon Peninsula. In the middle of the valley was a hill where two rivers ran west to the sea.

Kwun Chung Fort
The area between Austin Road and Jordan Road was originally hilly when Kwun Chung Fort was built by the Chinese (Qing) official Lin Tse-hsu to defend against the British. During the Battle of Kwun Chung in 1839, the fort, together with Tsim Sha Tsui Fort successfully kept British incursions from Kowloon. The fort with the hill was demolished for development during the early British rule of Kowloon and its rock and sand were used for reclamation for the area northwest of Jordan Road. Due to its strategic position, the British Army chose the hill south of Austin Road for the Whitfield Barracks and battery. Battery Street was probably named after it.

Demography
While the majority population is Cantonese and other ethnic Chinese, Kwun Chung also contains Nepalese, mostly from ex-Gurkhas, and other South Asian populations.

Arts and culture
Residents of Kwun Chung maintain practice of the Ghost Festival.

Landmarks
 King George V Memorial Park, Kowloon
 Kwun Chung Market

 
Yau Tsim Mong District
Nepalese diaspora in Hong Kong